Copine 3 is a protein that in humans is encoded by the CPNE3 gene.

Function

Calcium-dependent membrane-binding proteins may regulate molecular events at the interface of the cell membrane and cytoplasm. This gene encodes a protein which contains two type II C2 domains in the amino-terminus and an A domain-like sequence in the carboxy-terminus. The A domain mediates interactions between integrins and extracellular ligands. [provided by RefSeq, Aug 2008].

References

Further reading